The first USS Thistle was a Union Army steamer acquired  by the United States Navy during the American Civil War.

Thistle was placed in service and used by the Union Navy as a tugboat and, when the opportunity presented itself, as a gunboat, in the blockade of ports of the Confederate States of America.

Civil War operations

Transfer of Thistle from the Army to the Navy 

Thistle—formerly the Army tug Spiteful—was transferred by the War Department to the Union Navy on 1 October 1862.

Assigned to the Mississippi Squadron as a tug and recon vessel 
 
Thistle deployed with the Mississippi Squadron as a tug and reconnaissance vessel in October 1862 and participated in the capture of Fort Hindman, Arkansas, on 11 January 1863.

From 14 to 27 March, she took part in an expedition in the Steele's Bayou Expedition in Mississippi, attempting to find an entrance into the Yazoo River, Mississippi, and a rear approach to the Confederate stronghold at Vicksburg, Mississippi.

After the expedition failed, Thistle rejoined the squadron in the Mississippi River. There, she performed dispatch and reconnaissance duty for  the remainder of the war.

Post-war decommissioning and sale 
 
Thistle was decommissioned at Mound City, Illinois., on 12 August 1865 and was sold at public auction there on 17 August to J. T. Haight.

See also

Anaconda Plan

References 

Ships of the Union Navy
Steamships of the United States Navy
Tugs of the United States Navy
Gunboats of the United States Navy
Dispatch boats of the United States Navy
American Civil War auxiliary ships of the United States